Hurtsboro is a town in Russell County, Alabama, United States. At the 2010 census the population was 553, down from 592 in 2000. It was founded in 1857 as Hurtsville and named for Joel Hurt, Sr. (whose son, Joel Hurt, was an important developer of Atlanta, Georgia). A railroad spur from Columbus, Georgia was completed the next year. It was incorporated in 1872 and in 1883 the town name was changed to Hurtsboro.

The town is part of the Columbus, Georgia-Alabama Metropolitan Statistical Area.

History
In 1920 there was a standoff and siege at a house in Hurtsboro, Alabama, called the Hurtsboro race riot. The newspaper The Topeka State Journal called the incident a "New Race War."

Geography
Hurtsboro is located at  (32.240102, −85.415377).

Demographics

2020 census

As of the 2020 United States census, there were 349 people, 221 households, and 151 families residing in the town.

2000 census
As of the census of 2000, there were 592 people, 283 households, and 161 families residing in the town. The racial makeup of the town was 70.27% Black or African American, 29.39% White,  and 0.34% from two or more races. 0.17% of the population were Hispanic or Latino of any race.

There were 283 households, out of which 25.1% had children under the age of 18 living with them, 31.1% were married couples living together, 23.3% had a female householder with no husband present, and 43.1% were non-families. 41.7% of all households were made up of individuals, and 18.7% had someone living alone who was 65 years of age or older. The average household size was 2.09 and the average family size was 2.86.

In the town, the population was spread out, with 24.2% under the age of 18, 7.1% from 18 to 24, 25.7% from 25 to 44, 22.8% from 45 to 64, and 20.3% who were 65 years of age or older. The median age was 40 years. For every 100 females, there were 93.5 males. For every 100 females age 18 and over, there were 82.5 males.

The median income for a household in the town was $16,691, and the median income for a family was $25,000. Males had a median income of $26,979 versus $19,821 for females. The per capita income for the town was $16,908. About 28.4% of families and 32.8% of the population were below the poverty line, including 46.3% of those under age 18 and 28.5% of those age 65 or over.

Gallery

References

Towns in Alabama
Towns in Russell County, Alabama
Populated places established in 1857
Columbus metropolitan area, Georgia
1857 establishments in Alabama